is a Japanese actor and voice actor affiliated with Sigma Seven. Some of Matsumoto's most notable roles are Wataru Akiyama in Initial D, Jean Havoc in Fullmetal Alchemist, Magnum Ace in Shippū! Iron Leaguer, Gourry Gabriev in Slayers and Ryo Hibiki in Sonic Soldier Borgman. His wife was voice actress Junko Sakuma, who died in March 2011.

Career
Matsumoto graduated from the Department of Political Science, Faculty of Law, Chuo University after graduating from Yakuendai High School. He used to be a member of Production Baobab. He was also the vice-chairman of Sugoroku, a theater company led by Kenichi Ogata, and became the chairperson after Ogata retired. He later left the company in 2016.

When Matsumoto was a student, he was the captain of a cycle racing club, and has even participated in the National Athletic Meet. However, he left the club due to a back injury. Originally a science fiction enthusiast, he was a science major until he was in high school. However, after watching a political program on TV at some point, he became interested in the world's developments and entered the Department of Political Science in the Faculty of Law at Chuo University with the intention of becoming a bureaucrat. Although he hoped to pursue a career related to politics, he was faced with a harsh reality and spent his school days lost in his career path.

In the midst of all this, Matsumoto was impressed by the movie The Sound of Music, and since all of his friends at the boarding house were film buffs, he decided to become a film production staff member. However, when he graduated from university, the Japanese film industry was in a state of downsizing and there were not many good opportunities for staff, and unlike today, there were few production companies, so the road to film production was difficult. He decided to join a theatrical troupe, hoping to become staff after getting into the world of actors first. When he was about to graduate, a friend of his introduced him to Theater Company Garakuta Kōbō (now Sugoroku), which was recruiting, and he entered the affiliated training school as a fourth-year student.

Although he did not have much experience in voice work, when he went to observe a studio that was recording the voice actors' dubbing, he was surprised to see how all the cast members at the scene watched the footage only once on the spot and recorded it immediately, although nowadays actors receive rehearsal materials in advance. When he borrowed the script and watched the performance, his eyes could not keep up with the speed of the performers' work, and he couldn't follow where they were at. After that, he had several auditions for voice work, but had no idea what work he was auditioning for. In the midst of that, he was told to read a manuscript according to the feeling of an artwork he was shown, and when he did, he passed his first audition. That was to be his debut work, the anime TV series Manga Nihon Keizai Nyūmon.

Filmography

Anime television
1987
Kimagure Orange Road – Mitsuru Hayakawa
Manga Nihon Keizai Nyumon – Tsuchida
Mister Ajikko – Shougo
1988
Yoroiden Samurai Troopers – Cale (Yami Mashou Anubis)
Starship Troopers – Johnny Rico
Sonic Soldier Borgman – Ryo Hibiki
1989
Tenku Senki Shurato – Fudo Myo-o Acalantha
Idol Densetsu Eriko – Shogo Ohgi
1990
Brave Exkaiser – Shuntarou
Idol Angel Yokoso Yoko – Yutaka Tokudaiji
Karasu Tengu Kabuto – Kabuto
Idol Tenshi Yokoso Yoko – Yutaka
RPG Densetsu Hepoi – Michael
Samurai Pizza Cats – Zankaa
1991
The Brave Fighter of Sun Fighbird – Yutaro Katori/Fighbird
Future GPX Cyber Formula – Hiroyuki Kazami (young)
Romance of the Three Kingdoms – Cao Cao
1992
Tekkaman Blade – Noal Vereuse
Ashita e Free Kick – Tachibana Daichi
Cooking Papa – Tatsuya Kimura
Flower Witch Mary Bell – Jeat
Nangoku Shounen Papuwa-kun Umigishi-kun
Tekkaman Blade – Noal Vereuse
1993
YuYu Hakusho – Toya
The Brave Express Might Gaine – Black Gaine/Black Might Gaine
Shippu! Iron Leaguer – Magnum Ace
1994
Haō Taikei Ryū Knight – Tsukimi
Tottemo! Luckyman – Lucky Star
1995
Slayers – Gourry Gabriev
H2 – Fujio Koga
Kuma no Putaro – Conductor
Kyoryu Boukenki Jura Tripper – Mosaru
Mojacko – Ume-san
Ninku – Basara Ninku
Soar High! Isami – Mitsukuni
Street Fighter II V – Tyler (eps 3–4)
Virtua Fighter – Jacky Bryant
1996
VS Knight Ramune & 40 Fire – Narcist Dandy
B'tX – Zaji
Case Closed – Takehiko Fujie, Tsuze, Yuuzou
Kaiketsu Zorro – Teo
Martian Successor Nadesico – Genpachiro Akiyama
Midori no Makibao – Amago Wakuchin
Rurouni Kenshin – Tetsuma Okubo
Slayers Next – Gourry Gabriev
1997
Anime Ganbare Goemon – Goemon, Goemon Impact
Pokémon – Adult Lunick/Adult Kazuki
Kindaichi Shounen no Jikenbo – Makoto Toujou
Vampire Princess Miyu – Ryu Shinma
Vampiyan Kids – Vampire Hunter
Slayers Try – Gourry Gabriev
1998
Initial D – Wataru Akiyama
Lost Universe – Spreader of Darkness
Silent Mobius – Ralph Bomerz
Momoiro Sisters – Shouichi Tanaka
Nessa no Haoh Gandalla – Yuki Saijoh
Shadow Skill – Scarface
1999
Angel Links – Marcotte
Bucky – The Incredible Kid – En
Initial D: Second Stage – Wataru Akiyama
Legend of Himiko – Chosa
Starship Girl Yamamoto Yohko – Curtis Lawson
Steel Angel Kurumi – Kamihito Kagara
Wild Arms: Twilight Venom – Keanu, Kianu Fallwind
2000
Gravitation – Hiroshi Nakano
Love Hina – Noriyasu Seta
Boys Be... – Daisuke Nitta
Clockwork Fighters Hiwou's War – Kurogane
Sazae-san – Norisuke Namino
Vandread – Leader
2001
Star Ocean EX – Bowman Jean
Go! Go! Itsutsugo Land – Director (episode 19b)
Hellsing – Boz
Hero Hero-kun – Hero Hero-Papa
 – Kazuhito Oda
A Little Snow Fairy Sugar – Paul
Zone of the Enders – Joey
2002
Get Backers – Wan Paul
Princess Tutu – Neko-sensei
Twelve Kingdoms – Kantai
MÄR – Galian
Atashin'chi – Sport's Teacher (First)
Pokémon Advance – Kinya's Gold Usokki, Umezu
Getbackers – Paul Wang
Ghost in the Shell: Stand Alone Complex – Policeman
Mirage of Blaze – Shuhei Chiaki
Mobile Suit Gundam Seed – Haruma Yamato
Naruto – Postman Ninja
Cheeky Angel – Hosoi, Yanagisawa
2003
Croquette! – Worcester
E's Otherwise – Yuuki Tokugawa
F-Zero Falcon Densetsu – Beast-Man
Fullmetal Alchemist – Dolcetto, Jean Havoc
Maburaho – Shunji Kamishiro
Mermaid Forest – Eijiro (60 years ago), Fisherman
Rumiko Takahashi Anthology – Keiichi, Ruriko Tonegawa's husband, Takanezawa, Yoshio Hirooka
Sou Nanda – Chairman (ep 6)
Wolf's Rain – Horse (ep 20)
2004
Paranoia Agent – Zebra
Agatha Christie no Meitantei Poirot to Marple – Franklin Clarke
Black Jack – Kyuuma
Futari wa Pretty Cure – Juna
Initial D: Fourth Stage – Wataru Akiyama
Kannazuki no Miko – Tsubasa
Kyo kara Maoh! – Raven
The Melody of Oblivion – Lucky Thoroughbred
Midori Days – Masami Kyomoto
Otogi Zoshi – Shuten Doji
Phoenix – Inugami Harima (Sun Chapter)
Rockman.EXE Stream – Charlie Airstar
Space Symphony Maetel—Galaxy Express 999 Side Story – Ra Frankenbach Leopard
The Moon is East, The Sun is West: Operation Sanctuary – Fukano
2005
Doraemon – Nobisuke Nobi
Zoids Genesis – Major Zailin
Eureka Seven – Stoner
Gallery Fake – Jun Sekine 
Trinity Blood – Virgin Walsh
GUNxSWORD – Joe
Guyver: The Bioboosted Armor – Archanfel
Rockman.EXE Beast – Charlie Airstar
2006Black Jack 21 – Bill BuddLe Chevalier D'Eon – Earl St. GermainThe Familiar of Zero – Count MottGinga Tetsudo Monogatari: Eien e no Bunkiten – YurihiHataraki Man – ShimuraHell Girl: Two Mirrors – Eiichi KurebayashiLovege Chu – Miracle Seiyu Hakuso – Hisatoki EdogawaPumpkin Scissors – Messenger (episode 16)Higurashi When They Cry – Ichiro MaebaraZegapain – Kurashige
2007Darker Than Black – Gai KurasawaMobile Suit Gundam 00 – Alejandro CornerKoutetsu Sangokushi – Sonsaku HakufuNaruto: Shippuden – Ganryu and Kizashi HarunoDeltora Quest – King EndonGhost Hound – Takahito KomagusaHigurashi no Naku Koroni Kai – Ichirou MaebaraKaiji – FuruhataLes Miserables - Shoujo Cosette – FamuyuMobile Suit Gundam 00 – Alejandro CornerPrincess Resurrection – Pharaoh (ep12)Pururun! Shizuku-chan! – ChirikarareddoShion no Oh – Shinji YasuokaTerra e... – Jomy's father
2008Slayers Revolution – Gourry GabrievSoul Eater – Captain NidhoggGunslinger Girl: II Teatrino – European pole Bureau ChiefNatsume's Book of Friends – Tanuma's FatherYes! PreCure 5 GoGo! – King DonutsReal Drive – Shozo KominatoSands of Destruction – Cat Master (ep 1)Tales of the Abyss – Guy CecilYatterman – Kogoro Dokechi
2009Darker than Black: Gemini of the Meteor – Gai KurasawaFresh Pretty Cure – WesterKobato. – Sotaro MoriSlayers Evolution-R – Gourry Gabriev
2010Heroman – Doctor MinamiPokémon: Black and White – Cliff (ep 46)Psychic Detective Yakumo – Genichiro SakakibaraShowa Monogatari – Yuzo Yamazaki
2011Blade (Ikeda)Ground Control to Psychoelectric Girl – Yamamoto-san
2012Bodacious Space Pirates – Kenjo KuriharaEureka Seven – StonerInitial D Fifth Stage – Wataru AkiyamaMagi: The Labyrinth of Magic – BalkakSaint Seiya Omega – Hound Miguel
2013Monogatari Series Second Season – Mayoi's Father (ep 8)
2014Aikatsu! – Encierro Atsuji
2015JoJo's Bizarre Adventure: Stardust Crusaders – AnubisGo! Princess Precure – Ibuki HarunoRampo Kitan: Game of Laplace – Namikoshi's FatherYatterman Night – Beane
2017Altair: A Record of Battles – Doge Donatello Doria
2019Attack on Titan – Eren Kruger
2021SK8 the Infinity – Joe
2023MF Ghost – Wataru Akiyama

Unknown dateLady Blue – KyoshiroUrotsukidoji – Takeaki and BujuElven Bride – KenjiGrowlanser III: The Dual Darkness – Kenneth LeymonPuyo Puyo~n – Schezo WegeyNG Knight Ramune & 40 – Queen Cideron

Original video animation (OVA)Metal Skin Panic MADOX-01 (1987) – Kouji SugimotoArmor Hunter Mellowlink (1988) – Mellowlink ArityStarship Troopers (1989) – Jullian RicoCaptain Tsubasa (1989) – Louis NapoleonMōryō Senki Madara (1991) – KaosRG Veda (1991) – KujakuAdventure Kid (1992) – KazuyaKuro no Shishi (1992) – ShishimaruIdol Defense Force Hummingbird (1993) – Shunsaku KudoPlease Save My Earth (1993) – ShukaidoKyou Kara Ore Wa!! (1994) – Takahashi MitsuhashiSonic the Hedgehog (1996) – Knuckles the EchidnaShinesman (1996) – Hiroya Matsumoto / Shinesman Red

Anime filmsSonic Soldier Borgman: Last Battle – (1989) – Ryo HibikiHeavy – (1990) – Guy HyugaSonic Soldier Borgman: Lover's Rain – (1990) – Ryo HibikiChibi Maruko-chan: My Favorite Song (1992) – Ryo SatoUrotsukidoji II: Legend of the Demon Womb – (1993) – Takeaki KiryuDarkside Blues – (1994) – TatsuyaElementalors – (1995) – ShiohisaLegend of Crystania – (1995) – BorksNinku the Movie – (1995) – Basara/KisumiKimagure Orange Road: Summer's Beginning – (1996) – Mitsuru HayakawaPipi to Benai Hotaru – (1996) – KiraJungle Emperor Leo – (1997) – RamuneDoraemon: Nobita and the Winged Braves – (2001) – BabylonSlayers Premium – (2001) – Gourry GabrievGuilstein – (2002) – Chous DistourInuyasha the Movie: Swords of an Honorable Ruler – (2003) – Setsuna no Takemaru Fullmetal Alchemist the Movie: Conqueror of Shamballa – (2005) – Jean HavocDoraemon: Nobita's Dinosaur 2006 (2006) – Nobita's DadDoraemon: Nobita's New Great Adventure into the Underworld (2007) – Nobita's DadDoraemon: Nobita and the Green Giant Legend (2008) – Nobita's DadDoraemon the Movie: Nobita's Spaceblazer (2009) – Nobita's DadEureka Seven: Pocketful of Rainbows – (2009) – StonerDoraemon: Nobita's Great Battle of the Mermaid King (2010) – Nobita's DadMobile Suit Gundam 00 the Movie: A Wakening of the Trailblazer (2010) – Alejandro CornerDoraemon: Nobita and the New Steel Troops—Winged Angels (2011) – Nobita's DadPretty Cure All Stars DX3: Deliver the Future! The Rainbow-Colored Flower That Connects the World – (2011) – Black HoleShowa Monogatari – (2011) – Yuzo YamazakiDoraemon: Nobita and the Island of Miracles—Animal Adventure (2012) – Nobita's DadDoraemon: New Nobita's Great Demon—Peko and the Exploration Party of Five – (2014) – Nobita's DadStand By Me Doraemon (2014) – Nobita's DadDoraemon: Nobita and the Birth of Japan 2016 (2016) – Nobita's DadDoraemon the Movie 2017: Great Adventure in the Antarctic Kachi Kochi (2017) – Nobita's DadDoraemon the Movie: Nobita's Treasure Island (2018) – Nobita's DadDoraemon: Nobita's Chronicle of the Moon Exploration (2019) – Nobita's DadMy Hero Academia: Heroes Rising (2019) – Mahoro and Katsuma’s Father	Doraemon: Nobita's New Dinosaur (2020) – Nobita's DadStand by Me Doraemon 2 (2020) – Nobita's Dad

Tokusatsu
 Tensou Sentai Goseiger (2010) – Hognlo Alien Powereddark of the Mutation (ep 13)
 Tokumei Sentai Go-Busters (2012) – Danganloid (ep 10)
 Ressha Sentai ToQger (2014) – Type Shadow (ep 10)
 Ultraman X (2015) – Narration, Alien Fanton Guruman
 Ultraman X The Movie (2016) – Narration, Alien Fanton Guruman

Video games
 Logos Panic (1995) 
 Brave Saga series (1998-2005) - Yutaro Katori/Fighbird, Black Gaine/Black MightGaine
 Initial D Arcade Stage series (????–??) – Wataru Akiyama
 Kingdom Hearts, Kingdom Hearts II, and Kingdom Hearts Re:Coded (Kingdom Hearts HD 2.5 Remix) (2002, 2005, 2014) – Hercules
 Tales of the Abyss (2005) – Guy Cecil
 Mobile Suit Gundam SEED: Owaranai Ashita e (2006) –  Edward Harrelson
 Rockman X4 (Mega Man X4) (1997) – Double
 Tengai Makyou: Fuuun Kabuki Den (????) – Karune
 Super Robot Wars Original Generations series (????–??) – Folka Albark
 Super Robot Wars Series (????–??) – Alejandro Corner, Doctor Minami, Black Gaine/Black MightGaine
 Resident Evil: Revelations (2012) – Raymond Vester
 Gundam Breaker 3 (2016) – Robo-ta

Drama CD

 Abunai Series 2: Abunai Summer Vacation – Yoshiaki Sawatari
 Abunai Series 5: Abunai Shiawase Chou Bangaihen – Yoshiaki Sawatari, Chief, Kyou Sakuranomiya & Midori-san
 Abunai Series side story 1: Abunai Ura Summer Vacation – Yoshiaki Sawatari
 Analyst no Yuutsu series 1: Benchmark ni Koi wo Shite – Yoshio Kawaguchi
 Boku no Gingitsune – Takayuki Watanabe
 C Kara Hajimaru Koi mo Ii – Takatsugu Oda, Tadanori
 Endless series 1: Endless Rain – Atsui Katou
 Endless series 3: Endless Love – Atsui Katou
 Gin no Requiem – Dylan
 Gohan wo Tabeyou series 1, 2, 4–6 – Kaiou Hishida
 Mayonaka ni Oai Shimashou – Yamabuki Kaidouji
 Mirage of Blaze series 1: Mahoroba no Ryuujin – Shuuhei Chiaki
 Mirage of Blaze series 4: Washi yo, Tarega Tameni Tobu – Shuuhei Chiaki
 Mou Ichido Only You – Taniguchi
 Muteki na Bokura Series 1 – Kaoru Tachibana
 Muteki na Bokura Series 2: Oogami Datte Kowakunai – Kaoru Tachibana
 Muteki na Bokura Series 3: Shoubu wa Korekara! – Kaoru Tachibana
 Muteki na Bokura Series 4: Saikyou na Yatsura – Kaoru Tachibana
 Muteki na Bokura Series side story 1: Aitsu ni Muchuu – Kaoru Tachibana
 My Sexual Harassment series 1 – Junya Mochizuki
 Osananajimi – Takeda
 Pretty Baby 1 – Touru Makihara
 Shosen Kedamono Series 1: Shosen Kedamono – Tsukasa Muromachi
 Shosen Kedamono Series 2: Youko Nitsumaru – Tsukasa Muromachi
 Shosen Kedamono Series 3: Ryuuou no Hanayome – Tsukasa Muromachi
 Shosen Kedamono Series side story 2: Souko Gekka ni Hohoemu – elder Souko/Red Hair

Dubbing

Live-action
Adam Sandler
 Reign Over Me – Dr. Charlie Fineman
 Jack and Jill – Jack and Jill Sadelstein
 Just Go with It – Dr. Daniel "Danny" Maccabee
 That's My Boy – Donald 'Donny' Berger
 Grown Ups 2 – Lenny Feder
David Arquette
 RPM – Luke Delson
 See Spot Run – Gordon Smith
 Eight Legged Freaks – Chris McCormick
 Riding the Bullet – George Staub
Ryan Reynolds
 Green Lantern – Hal Jordan
 Safe House – Matt Weston
 R.I.P.D. – Nick Walker
 The Voices – Jerry Hickfang
 1492: Conquest of Paradise – Diego Columbus (Juan Diego Botto)
 200 Cigarettes – Kevin (Paul Rudd)
 54 – Greg Randazzo (Breckin Meyer)
 8 Heads in a Duffel Bag – Charlie Pritchett (Andy Comeau)
 The Absent-Minded Professor – Biff Hawk (Tommy Kirk)
 Addicted to Love – Sam (Matthew Broderick)
 Aliens – Private Spunkmeyer (Daniel Kash)
 Almost Famous – Ben Fong-Torres (Terry Chen)
 Anaconda (1999 TV Asashi edition) – Gary Dixon (Owen Wilson)
 Armageddon (2002 Fuji TV edition) – Oscar Choice (Owen Wilson)
 Assassins – Bob (Reed Diamond)
 Atomic Twister – Deputy Jake Hannah (Mark-Paul Gosselaar)
 Babel – Richard Jones (Brad Pitt)
 Backdraft – Washington (Richard Lexsee)
 Bad Education – Paca/Paquito (Javier Cámara)
 Ballistic: Ecks vs. Sever – Agent Harry Lee (Terry Chen)
 Battlestar Galactica – Lieutenant Starbuck (Dirk Benedict)
 Beethoven – Brad Wilson (David Duchovny)
 The Benchwarmers – Gus Matthews (Rob Schneider)
 The Bible: In the Beginning... – Abel (Franco Nero)
 Blossom – Anthony "Tony" Russo (Michael Stoyanov)
 Boogie Nights – Eddie Adams/Dirk Diggler (Mark Wahlberg)
 The Bridge – Marco Ruiz (Demián Bichir)
 Broken Arrow – Captain Riley Hale (Christian Slater)
 The 'Burbs – Ray Peterson (Tom Hanks)
 Center Stage – Cooper Nielson (Ethan Stiefel)
 Chicago Hope – Billy Kronk (Peter Berg)
 CODA – Bernardo "Mr. V" Villalobos (Eugenio Derbez)
 Cool Runnings – Derice Bannock (Leon Robinson)
 Cradle 2 the Grave – Ling (Mark Dacascos)
 Curse of the Starving Class – Wesley Tate (Henry Thomas)
 Dark Angel – Det. Matt Sung (Byron Mann)
 Dark Skies – John Loengard (Eric Close)
 Damages – Josh Reston (Matthew Davis)
 Dead Poets Society – Todd Anderson (Ethan Hawke)
 Dear Eleanor – Bob Potter (Luke Wilson)
 Death Kiss – Dan Forthright (Daniel Baldwin)
 Detention: The Siege at Johnson High – Jason Copeland (Ricky Schroder)
 The Distinguished Gentleman – Arthur Reinhardt (Grant Shaud)
 Enemy of the State – David Pratt (Barry Pepper)
 Eternal Sunshine of the Spotless Mind – Joel Barish (Jim Carrey)
 Fever Pitch – Ben Wrightman (Jimmy Fallon)
 Final Destination 2 – Officer Thomas Burke (Michael Landes)
 Finding Forrester – Massie (Glenn Fitzgerald)
 The Flintstones in Viva Rock Vegas – Chip Rockefeller (Thomas Gibson)
 Flirting with Disaster – Tony Kent (Josh Brolin)
 Frankenstein's Army – Dmitri (Alexander Mercury)
 Frankie's House – Tim Page (Iain Glen)
 The Freshman – Steve Bushak (Frank Whaley)
 Friday the 13th Part VIII: Jason Takes Manhattan – Sean Robertson (Scott Reeves)
 Fried Green Tomatoes – Buddy Threadgoode (Chris O'Donnell)
 From the Earth to the Moon – Jack Schmitt (Tom Amandes)
 Futuresport – Tremaine "Tre" Ramzey (Dean Cain)
 Gone in 60 Seconds – "Kip" Raines (Giovanni Ribisi)
 Growing Pains – Sandy (Matthew Perry)
 A Guy Thing – Paul Coleman (Jason Lee)
 Hannibal – Matteo (Fabrizio Gifuni)
 Her – Theodore Twombly (Joaquin Phoenix)
 Home Alone 3 – Jack Pruitt (Kevin Kilner)
 Homeward Bound: The Incredible Journey – Chance (Michael J. Fox)
 Homeward Bound II: Lost in San Francisco – Chance (Michael J. Fox)
 I Want You – Martin (Alessandro Nivola)
 The Irrefutable Truth about Demons – Harry Ballard (Karl Urban)
 The Immigrant – Bruno Weiss (Joaquin Phoenix)
 In Bruges – Ray (Colin Farrell)
 Independence Day (1999 TV Asashi edition) – Captain Jimmy Wilder (Harry Connick, Jr.)
 The Intern – Paul Rochester (Ben Pullen)
 Invincible – Keith Grady/Metal (Dominic Purcell)
 Jack – Brian Powell (Brian Kerwin)
 Jarhead – Cpl. Alan Troy (Peter Sarsgaard)
 Jason and the Argonauts – Jason (Jason London)
 Keeping the Faith – Father Brian Kilkenney Finn (Edward Norton)
 Lemony Snicket's A Series of Unfortunate Events – Lemony Snicket (Jude Law)
 Licence to Kill – Truman-Lodge (Anthony Starke)
 Life Goes On – Tyler Benchfield (Tommy Puett)
 London Boulevard – Harry Mitchel (Colin Farrell)
 Lucky Stars Go Places – Japanese Crime Lord Yukio Fushime (Tetsuya Matsui)
 Magnolia – Phil Parma (Philip Seymour Hoffman)
 Martians Go Home – Joe Fledermaus (Dean Devlin)
 Meet Joe Black – Drew (Jake Weber)
 Merlin – Mordred (Jason Done)
 Miami Vice – Det. James "Sonny" Crockett (Colin Farrell)
 Mighty Morphin Power Rangers: The Movie – Rocky DeSantos (Steve Cardenas)
 Mo' Better Blues – Bleek Gilliam (Denzel Washington)
 The Money Pit – Walter Fielding, Jr. (Tom Hanks)
 Mr. Magoo – Waldo Magoo (Matt Keeslar)
 Murder in the First – James Stamphill (Christian Slater)
 Must Love Dogs – Jake Anderson (John Cusack)
 My Cousin Vinny – Stan Rothenstein (Mitchell Whitfield)
 My Super Ex-Girlfriend – Matthew "Matt" Saunders (Luke Wilson)
 Office Christmas Party – Josh Parker (Jason Bateman)
 Once Upon a Time in China – Leung Foon (Yuen Biao)
 One True Thing – Jordan Belzer (Nicky Katt)
 The Others – Mark Gabriel (Gabriel Macht)
 Painted Faces – Teenage Samo (Chung Kam-yuen)
 The Pallbearer – Tom Thompson (David Schwimmer)
 Pegasus – Zhang Chi (Shen Teng)
 Pensacola: Wings of Gold – Lieutenant Wendell 'Cipher' McCray (Rodney Van Johnson)
 Point Break – FBI Agent Alvarez (Julian Reyes)
 Private Practice – Dr. Eric Rodriguez (Cristián de la Fuente)
 The Quick and the Dead – Fee "The Kid" Herod (Leonardo DiCaprio)
 REC – Sergio (Jorge-Yaman Serrano)
 The Returned – Jack Winship (Mark Pellegrino)
 A River Runs Through It – Paul Maclean (Brad Pitt)
 Sabrina – David Larrabee (Greg Kinnear)
 Scream 2 – Derek (Jerry O'Connell)
 seaQuest DSV – Sensor Chief Miguel Ortiz (Marco Sanchez)
 The Sentinel – Blair Sandburg (Garett Maggart)
 Seven – Detective David Mills (Brad Pitt)
 The Sky's On Fire – Racer (Ben Browder)
 Snatch – Tommy (Stephen Graham)
 Stealing Home – Teenage Billy Wyatt (William McNamara)
 Talk to Her – Benigno Martín (Javier Cámara)
 Taxi – Émilien Coutant-Kerbalec (Frédéric Diefenthal)
 Terror Tract segment "Make Me an Offer" – Allen Doyle (David DeLuise)
 The Third Wheel – Stanley (Luke Wilson)
 The Three Stooges – Moe Howard (Chris Diamantopoulos)
 Tremors – Melvin Plug (Robert Jayne)
 U-571 (2004 TV Asashi edition) – Lieutenant Pete Emmett (Jon Bon Jovi)
 The Untouchables – Agent Tony Pagano (John Newton)
 Veronica's Closet – Josh Nicolé Blair (Wallace Langham)
 Warriors – Alan James (Matthew Macfadyen)
 White Fang – Jack Conroy (Ethan Hawke)
 White Fang 2: Myth of the White Wolf – Jack Conroy (Ethan Hawke)
 Wing Commander – Lt. Christopher Blair (Freddie Prinze, Jr.)
 Woman on Top – Toninho Oliveira (Murilo Benício)
 The Wraith – William "Billy" Hankins (Matthew Berry)
 The X-Files – Alex Krycek (Nicholas Lea)
 The Young Riders – Noah Dixon (Don Franklin)

Animation
 Aladdin – Mozenrath
 Batman: The Animated Series – Dick Grayson/Robin
 Captain Underpants: The First Epic Movie – Principal Krupp/Captain Underpants
 F Is for Family – Frank Murphy
 FernGully: The Last Rainforest – Zak
 Flushed Away – Roddy
 Moominvalley – Moominpappa
 ReBoot – Bob (Fuji TV dub)
 Superman: The Animated Series – Dick Grayson
 The Epic Tales of Captain Underpants - Principal Krupp/Captain Underpants
 Turbo – Turbo
 Up'' – Dug

References

External links
  
 
 Yasunori Matsumoto at GamePlaza-Haruka Voice Acting Database 
 Yasunori Matsumoto at Hitoshi Doi's Seiyuu Database
 

1960 births
Living people
People from Matsudo
Male voice actors from Chiba Prefecture
Japanese male voice actors
Japanese male video game actors
20th-century Japanese male actors
21st-century Japanese male actors
Sigma Seven voice actors